is a professional Japanese baseball player. He plays pitcher for the Chunichi Dragons.

Early career
On 20 October 2017, Suzuki was selected as the 1st draft pick for the Chunichi Dragons at the 2017 NPB Draft and on 20 November signed a provisional contract with a ¥100,000,000 sign-on bonus and a ¥15,000,000 yearly salary with ¥50,000,000 in incentives.

Personal
Suzuki's hobbies include golf, basketball and cycling.
Suzuki counts former San Diego Padres, Atlanta Braves and Boston Red Sox closer Craig Kimbrel as his idol. He deliberately chose to wear the number 46 as an homage to Kimbrel.

On 23 January 2019, it was announced that Suzuki had married.

References

1997 births
Living people
Baseball people from Shizuoka Prefecture
Japanese baseball players
Nippon Professional Baseball pitchers
Chunichi Dragons players
People from Kakegawa, Shizuoka